Soe Myat Thuzar (born 31 August 1971) is a two-times Myanmar Academy awarded Burmese actress and writer. She is best known for acting in many Burmese films.

She started her acting career in September 1989.

Early life
Soe Myat Thuzar was born on 31 August 1971 in Yangon, Myanmar to parents, Major Soe Myint and Kyi Kyi Khin. She is the eldest daughter of four. The two sister Soe Myat Nandar and Soe Myat Kalayar are actress. And the two cousin Soe Pyae Thazin and Sandi Myint Lwin are also actress.

Filmography

Film (cinema)
Naw Yin Mway (1994)
Shwe Nant Thar San Eain (1998)
Shock Shi Tae A Chit Myar (2008)
Kyoe Tann (2008)
101 Nights with Mother-in-Law (2009)
Kyauk Sat Yay (2009)
Nat Phat Tae Sone Twal Myar (2010)
Kyauk Thin Pone Tway Moe Htar Tae Eain (2010)
May Khin Kanyar (2012)
Let Pan (2012)
Thwar Lu Soe Dar Myo Taw Tat Tal (2012)
Hna Pin Lain Tae Yee Sar Sar (2012)
Kyal Sin Maw Kun (2013)
Ko Tint Toh Super Yat Kwat (2014)
Bago Sarr Hnint Thu Ei Virus Myarr (2016)
Luu Yadanar Treasure (2016)
Oak Kyar Myet Pauk (2016)
Thu Ngal (2017)
Kyun (2017)
Sein Yauk Ma (2018)
Woman (2018)
Kiss Like Wine (2018)
Kyway (2018)
The Greatest Love (2019)
Players (2020)
Padauk Ka Tae Gita (2020)

Television series
A Yake (2018)
Legends of Warriors (2020)

Awards

Books
A Chit Sit Sit Myar 
Maung A Twant 
Yone Kyi Ywae Khan Sar Ya The Khan Sar Ya Ywae Yone Kyi 
Chit Mi Tae A Khar 
A Nar That Thit Sar 
Feeling  35

References

External links 

1971 births
Living people
20th-century Burmese actresses
20th-century Burmese women writers
20th-century Burmese writers
People from Yangon
21st-century Burmese actresses
21st-century Burmese women writers
21st-century Burmese writers